was a Japanese samurai and 10th head of the Mogami clan.

His daughter Lady Yoshi married Date Terumune and gave birth to Date Masamune.

References

Samurai
1520 births
1590 deaths
Mogami clan